Dave Harms is a former American football coach.  He served as the head coach at Manchester University in North Manchester, Indiana, from 1995 to 2003.

Harms played college football at Drake University.

Head coaching record

References

Year of birth missing (living people)
Living people
American football offensive linemen
Manchester Spartans football coaches
Drake Bulldogs football players
Upper Iowa Peacocks football coaches
Valparaiso Beacons football coaches